Yiwu is a city in Zhejiang province, China.

Yiwu may also refer to:
Yiwu County, county in Xinjiang, China
Yiwu, Mengla County, town in Mengla County, Yunnan, China
Prince Yiwu (died 637 BC), Duke Hui of Jin, during the Spring and Autumn Period of China's Zhou dynasty
Guan Yiwu (c. 720 BC – 645 BC), or Guan Zhong, Chinese chancellor of the State of Qi during the Spring and Autumn period